Gummi is a Local Government Area in Zamfara State, Nigeria. Its headquarters are in the town of Gummi at .

It has an area of 2,610 km2 and a population of 204,539 at the 2006 census.

The postal code of the area is 891.

Gummi was carved out of the former larger Sokoto state, which included the present Zamfara and Kebbi states. Gummi has a long history of relative peace and security.

The great majority of the people of the area are Hausa Fulani and Muslims and are predominantly farmers; the principal crop is  calabash.

Gallery

References

In Gummi local government there is also a tribe called Zamfarawa whose are the origin and founding fathers of Gummi, Anka and Talata Mafara which makes Zamfara as a state. Also Gummi local government divided into two state house of assembly constituencies, Gummi east and Gummi west, because of its population.

Local Government Areas in Zamfara State